Playlist Live is an annual convention held in Orlando, Florida, and Washington D.C., primarily for YouTube and TikTok  content creators. The convention has been held annually since 2010. The convention has also been held in the tri-state area as well as Orlando and Washington. The most recent event took place on September 3-September 5, 2021. The next event is scheduled for September 2-September 4, 2022. Notable content creators that have attended the event include Tana Mongeau, David Dobrik, Rebecca Black and Ricky Dillon. Content creators who are part of the Fullscreen multi-channel network, including MaxNoSleeves and Kristina Urribarres have also attended.

The program
Playlist Live’s programming is divided into three different tracks: the Community Track, the Insight Track and the Industry Track. These track ensure that all attendees, whether they be fans, creator, or managers and agents, have something to look forward to.

The Community Track is best suited for fans of YouTube creators. The panels on this track consist of creators talking about various lifestyle topics. These topics include mental health, staying motivated and LGBTQ life.

The Insight Track is created for current and aspiring YouTube content creators. The panels are geared toward teaching guests how to make a living from making Youtube videos.

The Industry Track is for guests who currently work in the media industry. This track benefits marketers, managers, agents, producers, etc. This track goes in depth of the technicalities of the business realm.

References

2011 establishments in the United States
Recurring events established in 2011
Web-related conferences
Web-related events
YouTube